Ictal asystole is a rare occurrence for patients that have temporal lobe epilepsy. It can often be identified by loss of muscle tone or the presence of bilateral asymmetric jerky limb movements during a seizure, although ECG monitoring is necessary to provide a firm result. Ictal asystole and Ictal bradycardia can cause an epileptic patient to die suddenly.

References 

Epilepsy